The 2002 Spengler Cup was held in Davos, Switzerland from December 26 to December 31, 2002.  All matches were played at host HC Davos's home Eisstadion Davos. The final was won 3-2 by Team Canada over host HC Davos.

Teams participating
 Team Canada
 HC Davos (host)
 Kölner Haie
 HC TPS
 HC Sparta Praha

Tournament

Round-Robin results

All times local (CET/UTC +1)

Finals

External links
Spenglercup.ch

2002–03
2002–03 in Swiss ice hockey
2002–03 in Czech ice hockey
2002–03 in Canadian ice hockey
2002–03 in Finnish ice hockey
2002–03 in German ice hockey
December 2002 sports events in Europe